County Kerry is a county in Ireland. It is located in the South-West Region and forms part of the province of Munster. It is named after the Ciarraige who lived in part of the present county. The population of the county was 155,258 at the 2022 census,

A popular tourist destination, Kerry's geography is defined by the MacGillycuddy's Reeks mountains, the Dingle, Iveragh and Beara peninsulas, and the Blasket and Skellig islands. It is bordered by County Limerick to the north-east and Cork County to the south and south-east.

Geography and subdivisions

Kerry is the fifth largest of Ireland's 32 traditional counties by area and the sixteenth largest by population. It is the second largest of Munster's six counties by area, and the fourth largest by population. Uniquely, it is bordered by only two other counties: County Limerick to the east and County Cork to the south-east. The county town is Tralee although the Catholic diocesan seat is Killarney, which is one of Ireland's most famous tourist destinations. The Lakes of Killarney, an area of outstanding natural beauty, are located in Killarney National Park. The Reeks District is home to Carrauntoohil, Ireland's highest mountain at 1,039m. The tip of the Dingle Peninsula is the westernmost point of Ireland.

Baronies
There are nine historic baronies in the county. While baronies continue to be officially defined units, they are no longer used for many administrative purposes. Their official status is illustrated by Placenames Orders made since 2003, where official Irish names of baronies are listed under "Administrative units".

 Clanmaurice – 
 Corkaguiny – 
 Dunkerron North – 
 Dunkerron South – 
 Glanarought – 
 Iraghticonnor – 
 Iveragh (Peninsula) – 
 Magunihy – 
 Trughanacmy –

Most populous towns

Physical geography

Kerry faces the Atlantic Ocean and, typically for an Eastern-Atlantic coastal region, features many peninsulas and inlets, principally the Dingle Peninsula, the Iveragh Peninsula, and the Beara Peninsula. The county is bounded on the west by the Atlantic Ocean and on the north by the River Shannon. Kerry is one of the most mountainous regions of Ireland and its three highest mountains, Carrauntoohil, Beenkeragh and Caher, all part of the MacGillycuddy's Reeks range.

Just off the coast are a number of islands, including the Blasket Islands, Valentia Island and the Skelligs. Skellig Michael is a World Heritage Site, famous for the medieval monastery clinging to the island's cliffs. The county contains the extreme west point of Ireland, Dunmore Head on the Dingle Peninsula, or including islands, Tearaght Island, part of the Blaskets. The most westerly inhabited area of Ireland is Dún Chaoin, on the Dingle Peninsula. The River Feale, the River Laune and the Roughty River flow through Kerry, into the Atlantic.

Climate
The North Atlantic Current, part of the Gulf Stream, flows north past Kerry and the west coast of Ireland, resulting in milder temperatures than would otherwise be expected at the 52 North latitude. This means that subtropical plants such as the strawberry tree and tree ferns, not normally found in northern Europe, thrive in the area.

Because of the mountainous area and the prevailing southwesterly winds, Kerry is among the regions with the highest rainfall in Ireland. Owing to its location, there has been a weather reporting station on Valentia for many centuries.

In 1986 the remnants of Hurricane Charley crossed over Kerry as an extratropical storm causing extensive rainfall, flooding and damage.

History

Kerry ( or in the original pre-Irish language reform spelling Ciarraighe) means the "people of Ciar" which was the name of the pre-Gaelic tribe who lived in part of the present county. The legendary founder of the tribe was Ciar, son of Fergus mac Róich. In Old Irish "Ciar" meant black or dark brown, and the word continues in use in modern Irish as an adjective describing a dark complexion. The suffix  raighe, meaning people/tribe, is found in various  -ry place names in Ireland, such as Osry—Osraighe Deer-People/Tribe. The county's nickname is the Kingdom.

Lordship of Ireland
On 27 August 1329, by Letters Patent, Maurice FitzGerald, 1st Earl of Desmond was confirmed in the feudal seniority of the entire county palatine of Kerry, to him and his heirs male, to hold of the Crown by the service of one knight's fee. In the 15th century, the majority of the area now known as County Kerry was still part of the County Desmond, the west Munster seat of the Earl of Desmond, a branch of the Hiberno-Norman FitzGerald dynasty, known as the Geraldines.

Kingdom of Ireland

In 1580, during the Second Desmond Rebellion, one of the most infamous massacres of the Sixteenth century, the Siege of Smerwick, took place at Dún an Óir near Ard na Caithne (Smerwick) at the tip of the Dingle Peninsula. The 600-strong Italian, Spanish and Irish papal invasion force of James Fitzmaurice Fitzgerald was besieged by the English forces and massacred.

In 1588, when the fleet of the Spanish Armada in Ireland were returning to Spain during stormy weather, many of its ships sought shelter at the Blasket Islands and some were wrecked.

During the Nine Years' War, Kerry was again the scene of conflict, as the O'Sullivan Beare clan joined the rebellion. In 1602 their castle at Dunboy was besieged and taken by English troops. Donal O'Sullivan Beare, in an effort to escape English retribution and to reach his allies in Ulster, marched all the clan's members and dependants to the north of Ireland. Due to harassment by hostile forces and freezing weather, very few of the 1,000 O'Sullivans who set out reached their destination.

In the aftermath of the War, much of the native owned land in Kerry was confiscated and given to English settlers or 'planters'. The head of the MacCarthy Mor family, Florence MacCarthy was imprisoned in London and his lands were divided between his relatives and colonists from England, such as the Browne family.

In the 1640s Kerry was engulfed by the Irish Rebellion of 1641, an attempt by Irish Catholics to take power in the Protestant Kingdom of Ireland. The rebellion in Kerry was led by Donagh McCarthy, 1st Viscount Muskerry. His son the Earl of Clancarty held the county during the subsequent Irish Confederate Wars and his forces were among the last to surrender to the Cromwellian conquest of Ireland in 1652. The last stronghold to fall was Ross Castle, near Killarney.

The Famine
In the 18th and 19th centuries Kerry became increasingly populated by poor tenant farmers, who came to rely on the potato as their main food source. As a result, when the potato crop failed in 1845, Kerry was very hard hit by the Great Irish Famine of 1845–49. In the wake of the famine, many thousands of poor farmers emigrated to seek a better life in America and elsewhere. Kerry was to remain a source of emigration until recent times (up to the 1980s). Another long term consequence of the famine was the Land War of the 1870s and 1880s, in which tenant farmers agitated, sometimes violently, for better terms from their landlords.

War of Independence and Civil War

In the 20th century, Kerry was one of the counties most affected by the Irish War of Independence (1919–21) and Irish Civil War (1922–23). In the war of Independence, the Irish Republican Army fought a guerilla war against the Royal Irish Constabulary, and British military. One of the more prominent incidents in the conflict in Kerry was the siege of Tralee in November 1920, when the Black and Tans placed Tralee under curfew for a week, burned many homes, and shot dead a number of local people in retaliation for the IRA killing of five local policemen the night before. Another was the Headford Junction ambush in spring 1921, when IRA units ambushed a train carrying British soldiers outside Killarney. About ten British soldiers, three civilians and two IRA men were killed in the ensuing gun battle. Violence between the IRA and the British was ended in July 1921, but nine men, four British soldiers and five IRA men, were killed in a shoot-out in Castleisland on the day of the truce itself, indicating the bitterness of the conflict in Kerry.

Following the Anglo-Irish Treaty, most of the Kerry IRA units opposed the settlement. One exception existed in Listowel where a pro-Treaty garrison was established by local Flying Column commandant Thomas Kennelly in February 1922. This unit consisted of 200 regular soldiers along with officers and NCOs. A batch of rifles, machine guns and a Crossley tender were sent from Dublin. Listowel would remain a base for those supporting the treaty throughout the conflict. The town was eventually overcome by superior numbers of anti-Treaty forces belonging to the Kerry No. 2 and 3 Brigades in June 1922. In the ensuing civil war between pro- and anti-treaty elements, Kerry was perhaps the worst affected area of Ireland. Initially the county was held by the Anti-Treaty IRA but it was taken for the Irish Free State after seaborne landings by National Army troops at Fenit, Tarbert and Kenmare in August 1922. Thereafter the county saw a bitter guerilla war between men who had been comrades only a year previously. The republicans, or "irregulars", mounted a number of successful actions, for example attacking and briefly re-taking Kenmare in September 1922. In March 1923 Kerry saw a series of massacres of republican prisoners by National Army soldiers, in reprisal for the ambush of their men—the most notorious being the killing of eight men with mines at Ballyseedy, near Tralee. The internecine conflict was brought to an end in May 1923 as the rule of law was re-established following the death of IRA Chief of Staff Liam Lynch, and the order by Frank Aiken to dump all arms.

Local government

County council

The principal local authority is Kerry County Council. The council provides a number of services including planning, roads maintenance, fire brigade, council housing, water supply, waste collection, recycling and landfill, higher education grants and funding for arts and culture.

Town councils
An additional tier of local government existed in the three largest towns in the county, Killarney, Listowel and Tralee until the 2014 local elections were held on 23 May 2014. These elections were held following the changes effected by the Local Government Reform Act 2014. The act abolished town councils and introduced municipal districts. County Kerry was divided into four municipal districts, which are identical with the local electoral areas (LEA) used for election of Councillors.

Parliamentary representation
Following boundary changes in 2016, Kerry is represented in Dáil Éireann by five TDs returned from a single parliamentary constituency. The TDs elected to the 33rd Dáil Éireann at the 2020 general election included Pa Daly (SF), Norma Foley (FF), Brendan Griffin (FG), Danny Healy-Rae (Independent) and Michael Healy-Rae (Independent).

Culture
As a region on the extremity of Ireland, the culture of Kerry was less susceptible to outside influences and has preserved the Irish language, as well as Irish traditional music, song and dance. The Sliabh Luachra area of northeast Kerry, that borders Limerick and Cork, is renowned for its traditional music, dance and song, especially its slides, polkas and fiddle playing. The Siamsa Tíre centre in Tralee is a hub of traditional Irish pastimes. Corca Dhuibhne and Uíbh Ráthach are considered Gaeltacht regions and Irish culture is also very strong in these areas.

The Blasket Islands off the Dingle Peninsula are known for their rich literary heritage; authors such as Peig Sayers, Muiris Ó Súilleabháin and Tomás Ó Criomhthain have all written books about life on the islands, which were evacuated in 1953 due to increasingly extreme weather conditions that made them uninhabitable. John B Keane, a native of Listowel, is considered one of Ireland's greatest playwrights and is known for his works such as The Field, Sive and Big Maggie. The annual Listowel Writers' Week Festival serves as a celebration of Irish writers past and present.

Sport

Gaelic games
Kerry is known for its senior Gaelic football team. Gaelic football is by far the dominant sport in the county, and Kerry has the most successful of all football teams; the Kerry footballers have won the Sam Maguire cup 38 times, with the next nearest team Dublin on 30 wins. Hurling is popular at club level in north Kerry, although the county has only won one All-Ireland Senior Hurling Championship, in 1891. The senior team currently compete in the Joe McDonagh Cup.

Association football
The Kerry District League is the main competition for association football in the county. Tralee Dynamos have represented Kerry in the A Championship, while they and Killarney Celtic also competed in the Munster Senior League during the late 1990s and early 2000s.

Cricket
Cricket is played in County Kerry by County Kerry Cricket Club. They play their home games at the Oyster Oval near Tralee.

Irish language

In 2011 there were 6,083 Irish language speakers in County Kerry, with 4,978 native speakers within the Kerry Gaeltacht. This does not count the 1,105 attending the four Gaelscoils (Irish language primary schools) and two Gaelcholáiste (Irish language secondary schools) outside the Kerry Gaeltacht.

Places of interest

Kerry, with its mountains, lakes and nearly 1,000 kilometres of Atlantic coastline is among the most scenic areas in Ireland and is among the most significant tourist destinations in Ireland. Killarney is the centre of the tourism industry, which is a significant element of the economy in Kerry. The Kerry Way, Dingle Way and Beara Way are walking routes in the county. The Ring of Kerry on the Iveragh Peninsula is a popular route for tourists and cyclists. The pedestrian version is the scenic Kerry Way which follows ancient paths generally higher than that adopted by the Ring of Kerry.

Kerry has an abundance of archaeological sites. The earliest evidence of human settlement dates to the Mesolithic period. The county has a notably high concentration of open-air Atlantic rock art, which is believed to date to the Late Neolithic / Early Bronze Age period (2300-1500BC). This rock art is scattered throughout the county and exists in dense clusters on the Iveragh and Dingle peninsulas. These carvings form part of a tradition which stretches across Atlantic Europe and are distinct from the megalithic art of the type found at Newgrange. Kerry has many Bronze Age monuments including standing stones, wedge tombs, boulder burials, and stone circles, along with Iron Age forts. Like the rest of Ireland, Kerry has large numbers of monuments from the Early Christian period, such as ring forts, churches, cross-inscribed stones, holy wells, saints’ graves, and ogham stones, along with Medieval castles and churches.

Attractions:

Ballinskelligs
Banna Strand
Blasket Islands
Blennerville Windmill
Caragh Lake
Carrauntoohil
Conor Pass
Dingle Peninsula
Eightercua
Ecclesiastical sites at Ardfert
Fenit Harbour
Gallarus Oratory
Killarney National Park
Kerry County Museum
Kerry Woollen Mills
Lakes of Killarney
Lartigue Monorail
Maharees
Mount Brandon
Muckross House
Rattoo Round Tower and Sheela na Gig
Ring of Kerry
Ross Castle
Rossbeigh beach
Scotia's Grave
Siamsa Tíre
Skellig Michael
Torc Waterfall
Uragh Stone Circle
Valentia Island

Media
County Kerry has two local newspapers, The Kerryman and Kerry's Eye, both published in Tralee.

The county has a commercial radio station, Radio Kerry, which commenced operations in 1990. RTÉ Raidió na Gaeltachta has a studio in Baile na nGall in the west Kerry gaeltacht. Spin South West has a studio in Tralee, which commenced operations in 2016.

Infrastructure

Road

The main National Primary Routes into Kerry are the N21 road from Limerick and the N22 road from Cork, each terminating in Tralee. Kerry Airport is situated on the N23 road between Castleisland and Farranfore which connects the N21 and N22. Within Kerry the main National Secondary Routes include the well-known Ring of Kerry which follows the N70 road that circles the Iveragh Peninsula and links at Kenmare with the N71 road to west Cork.
The N86 road connects Tralee with Dingle along the Dingle Peninsula, while the N69 road from Limerick links Listowel and Tralee through north Kerry.

Greenways
There is a developing greenway network across the county. The North Kerry (part of the Great Southern Trail), South Kerry and Tralee-Fenit greenways are under-development or in the planning phases.

Rail

Kerry is served by rail at Tralee railway station, Farranfore railway station, Killarney railway station and Rathmore railway station which connect to Cork and Dublin Heuston, via Mallow.

Branch line services existed to each of the peninsulas (Beara, Iveragh and Dingle) and also to the north of the county. They were closed during the rationalisations of the 1950s and 1960s.
 Tralee and Dingle Light Railway: a narrow-gauge railway that closed in July 1953.
 Kenmare via Headford Junction: (8 miles outside Killarney) closed in early 1960.
 Valentia Harbour via Farranfore: also closed in early 1960. The Gleesk Viaduct near Kells, the viaduct at Killorglin, and many other structures on the line still exist.
 Listowel was served via the North Kerry line, which extended from Tralee to Limerick. Passenger service ceased in 1963, freight in 1983 and the lines were pulled up in 1988.
 Fenit was served via a branch off the North Kerry line until 1978; the rails are still in place.

Listowel to Ballybunion had the distinction of operating experimental Lartigue Monorail services from 1882 to 1924. A 500m section was re-established in 2003. A road-car route, the Prince of Wales Route, was a link from Bantry to Killarney, operated by the Cork, Bandon and South Coast Railway as a service for tourists.

Bus
Bus Éireann operates an extensive bus service network on routes throughout the county, with connection hubs in Killarney and Tralee.

Air

Kerry Airport is located at Farranfore in the centre of the county and has operated scheduled services since 1989. Destinations served as of 2014 are London (Stansted & Luton), Frankfurt-Hahn Airport, Faro, Portugal and Alicante all operated by Ryanair. Aer Lingus Regional also operate an all-year-round service to Dublin. The airport is served by Farranfore railway station.

Sea

Fenit harbour near Tralee is a regional harbour capable of handling ships of up to 17,000 tonnes. Large container cranes from Liebherrs in Killarney are regularly exported worldwide. A rail-link to the port was closed in the 1970s. The harbour at Dingle is one of Ireland's secondary fishing ports. In the north of the county, a ferry service operates from Tarbert to Killimer in County Clare.

Hospitals

Hospitals in Kerry include the public University Hospital Kerry which is the second-largest acute hospital in the Health Service Executive South Region. It serves as the main hospital for County Kerry and also serves the people in parts of north Cork and west Limerick. Other hospitals include the private Bon Secours Hospital in Tralee and community hospitals in Cahirciveen, Dingle, Kenmare, Killarney and Listowel.

Education
The Institute of Technology, Tralee (IT Tralee),  to be merged into Munster Technological University (MTU), is the main third-level institution in the county. It was established in 1977 as the Regional Technical College, Tralee but acquired its present name in 1997. It has an enrolment of about 3,500 students. The institute has two campuses: the North campus (opened in Dromtacker in 2001) and the South campus (opened in Clash in 1977) approximately 2.4 km (1.5 mi) apart.

Septs, families, and titles
A number of Irish surnames are derived from septs who hail from the Kerry area, such as Falvey, Foley, McCarthy, Murphy, O'Connor, O'Moriarty, Clifford, Kennelly, McGrath, O'Carroll, O'Sullivan, O'Connell, O'Donoghue, O'Shea, Quill, Scannell, Stack, Sugrue and Tangney.

The area was also home to the Hiberno-Norman families, the FitzMaurices and the Desmonds, a branch of the FitzGeralds.

Titles in the British Peerage of Ireland with a family seat in Kerry are
the Knight of Kerry – a branch of Fitzgeralds who had lands at Valentia Island
the Earl of Kenmare (also Viscount Castlerosse, Viscount Kenmare and Baron Castlerosse) – the descendants of Sir Valentine Browne who was awarded lands in Killarney
the Earl of Desmond – the Fitzgeralds of Desmond who had lands in North Kerry until they were seized at the end of the Desmond Rebellions
the Marquess of Lansdowne (also Earl of Shelburne, Baron Dunkeron) – the descendants of Sir William Petty who was awarded lands in Kenmare and elsewhere
the Earl of Kerry (also Baron Kerry, Viscount Clanmaurice) – the Fitzmaurice family
the Earl of Listowel – the Hare family
the Baron Ventry – the Mullins family who had lands in the Dingle Peninsula, including Ventry

Viscount Valentia appears to have been associated with lands in County Armagh, rather than Kerry.

People

Associated People:
Roger Casement
Wolfe Tone
Cearbhall Ó Dálaigh

Historical:
Daniel O'Connell
Thomas Ashe
Annie Chemis
Tom Crean
Con Cremin
Austin Stack
Horatio Kitchener
Richard Kelliher
Jennifer Musa
Charlie Daly
Maurice Moynihan
Patrick Edward Connor
William Melville
Richard Cantillon
John Connors
Saint Brendan
Trevor Chute

Literary & Musical:
Con Houlihan
Thomas O'Brien Butler
Malachi Martin
Julia Clifford
Jerome Connor
Canon James Goodman
John B. Keane
Brendan Kennelly
Denis Murphy
Thomas MacGreevy
Ernest John Moeran
Paula Murrihy
Tomás Ó Criomhthain
Eoghan Rua Ó Súilleabháin
Padraig O'Keeffe
Arthur O'Leary
Muiris Ó Súilleabháin
Aogán Ó Rathaille
Peig Sayers
Larry Mathews
Christie Hennessy
John Moriarty
Paddy Cronin
Patrick S. Dinneen
Mark Lanegan

Sport:
Danny Barnes
Edward Barrett
John Barrett
Colm Cooper
Patrick Clifford
Jack Doyle
Mick Doyle
Maurice Fitzgerald
Tony Flavin
Thos Foley
Paul Galvin
Mick Galwey
JJ Hanrahan
David Higgins
Liam Higgins
Robert Hilliard
Moss Keane
Tadhg Kennelly
Jerry Kiernan
John Lawlor
Jack McKenna
Bryan Cooper
Ultan Dillane
Mick O'Connell
Mick O'Dwyer
Gillian O'Sullivan
Paul Griffin
Darragh Ó Sé
Pat Spillane
Jack O'Shea
Mark O'Connor
Tommy Walsh
Sean Wight

Film/Stage/Radio:
Michael Fassbender
Eamon Kelly
Fodhla Cronin O'Reilly
Richard Wall
Jessie Buckley
Timothy V. Murphy

Political:
Martin Ferris
Jackie Healy-Rae
Joe Higgins
Thomas O'Driscoll
Dick Spring

Fashion:
Don O'Neill

See also
Wild Atlantic Way

References

External links

 Gaelscoil stats
 Gaeltacht Comprehensive Language Study 2007
Ring of Kerry Tourism

 
Kerry
Kerry
Kerry